Pioneers of African-American Cinema (2015) is a digitally restored anthology collection of independent Black cinema from the first half of the 20th century.

Known as "race films," this category of film was made outside the of the Hollywood system, and is notable for its exploration of issues of "class, gender, and politics within the Black community." The most important of these filmmakers was groundbreaking auteur Oscar Micheaux, whose films Within Our Gates (1920), with "its head-on confrontation of racism and lynching,"The Symbol of the Unconquered (1920), about black homesteaders struggling for survival against the Ku Klux Klan on the Midwestern plains," and Body and Soul (1925), featuring legendary performer Paul Robeson's debut as an escaped prisoner, are all included. Directors Spencer Williams, Richard Maurice, writer and ethnographer Zora Neale Hurston, and film-making couple James and Eloyce Gist are all represented, too, however, as are a variety of selections from the Ebony Film Corporation, work by Solomon Sir Jones and more.

The complete run time of the entire anthology is more than 25 hours, and the restoration will be of particular significance to scholars, historians, and film aficionados due to its inclusion of formerly inaccessible footage. The restoration includes over 12 feature films, including: Hell-Bound Train, Within Our Gates, Birthright, and The Flying Ace. It also includes shorts, fragments, trailers, documentary footage, archival interviews and audio recordings. For greater historical context, some films are presented in pairs, including Hot Biskits and The Blood of Jesus and Verdict Not Guilty and Heaven-Bound Travelers. Musical accompaniment includes work by DJ Spooky, Max Roach, Alloy Orchestra, Samuel Waymon, Makia Matsumura, Donald Sosin and others.

Funded in part by a Kickstarter campaign, the series was produced in association with the Library of Congress, with the cooperation of the British Film Institute, George Eastman Museum, Museum of Modern Art, National Archives, National Museum of African American History and Culture, Southern Methodist University, and the UCLA Film & Television Archive. Curated by scholars Charles Musser and Jacqueline Najuma, the anthology was distributed by Kino Lorber, which specializes in historic art house film.

The box set is available streaming, on BLU-RAY and on DVD, the latter of which is accompanied by a 76-page booklet. The New York Times praised the collection and recommended it for educational institutions.

Anthology Contents

See also
African American cinema
Black women film pioneers
Black women filmmakers
Race film

References

Race films
Silent film
African-American film directors
African-American cultural history
African-American history between emancipation and the civil rights movement